Luma is a genus of flowering plants in the myrtle family Myrtaceae, described as a genus in 1853. It is native to the Valdivian temperate rain forests of Chile and Argentina.

The leaves are opposite, oval, 1–5 cm long and 0.5–3 cm broad, entire, glossy dark green, with a spicy scent if crushed. The flowers are 2 cm diameter with four white petals and numerous stamens; the fruit is a small purple or black berry 1 cm diameter.

The genus name derives from the Mapuche (Native American) name for a related species, Amomyrtus luma. Though it grows slowly, luma wood is very dense and durable.

Species

formerly included
A long list of over 100 other names have been proposed in the genus, nearly all of them now regarded as members of other genera: Blepharocalyx, Eugenia, Myrceugenia, etc.

References

Myrtaceae
Myrtaceae genera
Flora of South America
Flora of the Valdivian temperate rainforest